Barbara Brylska (born 5 June 1941) is a Polish actress who gained critical acclaim in 1960s and was featured in numerous films throughout the countries of the Warsaw Pact including the Soviet Union. She is noted especially for her role as Nadya in the 1976 Soviet comedy film Irony of Fate.

Biography
Barbara Brylska was born on June 5, 1941, in Skotniki, near Łódź, Poland. At the age of 15, she was cast in the film Kalosze szczęścia. After this role, she took acting lessons in a theater school and became a student at the National Film School in Łódź, where in 1967 she completed her acting education at the Faculty of Acting.

Brylska's first major role was in the film Ich dzień powszedni (1963). In 1966 she played the Phoenician priestess Kama in the feature film Pharaoh, based on the novel by Bolesław Prus.

Apart from Polish-directed movies, she has also played in films directed by Soviet, Czechoslovak and Bulgarian directors.

For her role as Nadya in the 1975 film Irony of Fate, directed by Eldar Ryazanov, she received a Soviet state award. Her acceptance of this award created controversy in her home country. Nonetheless she became a popular actress in the Soviet Union. She would later claim that her success caused jealousy in the Polish film community and led it to ignore her work.

In 1977 she was a member of the jury at the 10th Moscow International Film Festival.

Since 2000 Brylska has been acting in stage plays, primarily in Russia.  She reprised the role of the aged Nadya in the 2007 Irony of Fate: The Sequel.

Awards
 State award of the Soviet Union — 1977: Irony of Fate

References

Inline:

External links
 External image: Barbara Brylska in a dancing scene in Polish film Pharaoh (1966).
 
  Article about Barbara Brylska in the Bulvar Newspaper

1941 births
Living people
People from Zgierz County
Łódź Film School alumni
Polish film actresses
20th-century Polish actresses
Knights of the Order of Polonia Restituta
Recipients of the Gold Cross of Merit (Poland)
Recipients of the USSR State Prize